The United Presbyterian Church in Malad City, Idaho was built in 1882 and was listed on the National Register of Historic Places in 1979.

Its NRHP nomination describes it as "a small and unpretentious brick chapel".

See also
 List of National Historic Landmarks in Idaho
 National Register of Historic Places listings in Oneida County, Idaho

References

Buildings and structures in Oneida County, Idaho
Churches on the National Register of Historic Places in Idaho
Presbyterian churches in Idaho
National Register of Historic Places in Oneida County, Idaho